

Petru Picior-Mare was a Bessarabian politician.

He served as Member of the Moldovan Parliament (1917–1918).

Gallery

Bibliography 
Gheorghe E. Cojocaru, Sfatul Țării: itinerar, Civitas, Chişinău, 1998, 
Mihai Taşcă, Sfatul Țării şi actualele autorităţi locale, "Timpul de dimineaţă", no. 114 (849), June 27, 2008 (page 16)

External links 
 Arhiva pentru Sfatul Tarii
 Deputaţii Sfatului Ţării şi Lavrenti Beria

Notes

Moldovan MPs 1917–1918
Year of death missing
Year of birth missing